Domingo Casco (born 14 August 1948) is an Argentine boxer. He competed in the men's bantamweight event at the 1968 Summer Olympics.

References

External links
 

1948 births
Living people
Argentine male boxers
Olympic boxers of Argentina
Boxers at the 1968 Summer Olympics
Sportspeople from Chaco Province
Bantamweight boxers